A scorewriter, or music notation program is software for creating, editing and printing sheet music. A scorewriter is to music notation what a word processor is to text, in that they typically provide flexible editing and automatic layout, and produce high-quality printed results.

Most scorewriters, especially those from the 2000s, can record notes played on a MIDI keyboard (or other MIDI instruments), and play music back via MIDI or virtual instruments. Playback is especially useful for novice composers and music students, and when musicians are not available or affordable. Several free programs are widely used, such as MuseScore. The three main professional-level programs are Finale, Sibelius and Dorico.

Comparison with multitrack sequencer software
Multitrack sequencer software and scorewriters typically employ different methods for notation input and display.

Scorewriters are based on traditional music notation, using staff lines and round note heads, which originates from European classical music. They use symbols representing durations in sound and silence, dynamics, articulations and tempo. Some also allow users to import and/or create their own symbols. Multitrack sequencer software typically uses a multitrack recorder metaphor as the main interface, with multiple tracks and track segments. Individual tracks can be edited using graphic notation in the form of a "piano roll"-guided input for the control of MIDI-based hardware and software instruments.

A third approach has also emerged that combines the first two input methods into a digital audio workstation, allowing users to score parts using traditional notation, the graphic notation of the piano roll, and recording acoustic or electronic instruments in real time alongside the existing scores. With all three methods, the computer keyboard, mouse, and a MIDI musical keyboard can be used to enter music that can then be edited with traditional or piano-roll-based notation.

History
The rapid growth of desktop computers in the 1980s saw the creation of dozens of early scorewriters (see list of scorewriters). They were a boon to young composers, music educators and composition students, providing a much less expensive way to create scores and parts for orchestral music and other works. However, they were hard to use; and while scores were readable, they did not look like professionally engraved scores or parts. An exception was SCORE notation software. Developed in the late '80s, it was used mostly by commercial publishers, as its price put it out of the reach of most non-professional composers/copyists. During the 1990s, many of these early programs fell into disuse, as newer programs surpassed them in ease of use and output quality. Finale and Sibelius were released, with high-quality output and a wide range of sophisticated features that made them suitable for almost all kinds of music applications.

By 2000, the market was dominated by Finale (particularly in the US) and Sibelius (which had dominated the UK since 1993, and expanded worldwide after its Windows release in 1998). Inexpensive programs such as capella gained a significant share of the market in some countries. Sibelius and Finale still dominated the market as of 2012.

In 2006, Sibelius was purchased by Avid. In a 2012 restructuring, Sibelius's London office was closed and the development team dismissed. In February 2013, Steinberg announced it had hired the former Sibelius team to create a new scorewriter, Dorico, which was released in October 2016. The trio of Finale, Sibelius and Dorico are today's leading professional-level programs.

Functionality

All scorewriters allow the user to input, edit and print music notation to varying degrees of sophistication. They range from programs which can write a simple song, piano piece or guitar tab, to those that can handle the complexities of orchestral music, specialist notations (from early music to avant-garde), and high-quality music engraving.

Music can usually be input using the mouse, computer keyboard, or a MIDI keyboard. A few allow input by scanning scores using musical OCR; by playing or singing into a microphone; or by using a touch screen.

Most scorewriters also allow users to play the music back, using MIDI or virtual instruments such as VST instruments. The screen can show at one time both the score and, by changing the colour of keys on a virtual piano's keyboard, the notes being played. Although sequencers can also write some musical notation, they are primarily for recording and playing music. Scorewriters can typically write more complex and sophisticated notation than sequencers can. 

Some scorewriters allow users to customize and fine-tune the printed output to a considerable degree, as is required by publishers to produce high-quality music engraving and to suit their individual house style.

A few scorewriters allow users to publish scores on the Internet, where they can be (for example) played back, transposed, and printed out, perhaps for a fee.

Most scorewriters provide other musical functions such as transposing; producing separate instrumental parts from a full score; or applying musical transformations such as retrograde. Some can automatically create instrumental exercises and student worksheets. Some support plug-ins, often developed by users or other companies. Other features may include version control, change tracking, graphics import and export, Post-It-like sticky notes, etc.

File formats
Almost all scorewriters use their own file formats for saving files. Hence, in order to move notation between different scorewriters (or to/from other kinds of music software such as sequencers), most scorewriters can also import or export one or more standard interchange file formats, such as:

Standard MIDI File is supported by almost all scorewriters. However, as this format was designed for playback (e.g. by sequencers) rather than notation, it only produces approximate results and much notational information is lost in the process. If the score is to be presented, a WAV file (rather than MIDI) may be made from the score to give a more natural and accurate rendition of the written score.
MusicXML has in recent years (as of 2012) become the standard interchange format for accurate notation.
NIFF is a now-obsolete file format that was supported by a few scorewriters.

This Comparison of scorewriters details which score writers can import and export to PDF, text (ASCII), picture (PNG, SVG, EMF) and sound (Vorbis OGG) file formats.

There are also human-readable text-based formats such as ABC notation, LilyPond, ASCII tab and NoteWorthy Composer text files. These are easily rendered as speech by screen reading software. The  to MediaWiki can render, and generate an audio preview of, the first two formats.

See also
Comparison of scorewriters
International Music Score Library Project (IMSLP)
Player piano
Scorereader 
List of music software

References

External links
Musical notation codes – information on most known musical notation file formats
Comparison of 200 Music Fonts from Standard Notation Software
List of typeset music formats, International Music Score Library Project

 
Music software